Binhaixi (Binhai West) railway station, formerly known as Binhai railway station, is a railway station on the Tianjin–Qinhuangdao high-speed railway and is the largest located within the Binhai New Area, Tianjin, China. It is one of four major rail hubs in Tianjin, with Tianjin, Tianjin West and Binhai railway stations. The name of the station was changed from Binhai to Binhai West on 5 January 2019.

The station was opened on 1 December 2013 along with the Tianjin–Qinhuangdao high-speed railway. It will be served by Line B1 and Line Z2 of Tianjin Metro in the future.

Location
This station is located on Haichuan Lu (Road), Binhai, Tianjin. It serves as the major long-distance high-speed railway station for the Binhai New Area. It is located 12 km from the central business district of Binhai, adjacent to the south of the Tianjin Economic and Technology Development Area (TEDA).

Station Structure
The station has two island and two side platforms, serving eight high-speed rail tracks. Future expansion has been allowed for with extra space for new platforms and tracks north of the existing lines. The Waiting Hall is situated above the tracks has a designed peak capacity of 2,500 people. Platforms and the station entrances are at ground level. Basement levels contain the Arrivals Hall and parking for 990 private cars. A long distance bus station with an area of 20,000 square metres is attached to the station complex.

References

Railway stations in Tianjin
Railway stations in China opened in 2013
Stations on the Tianjin–Qinhuangdao High-Speed Railway